Elizabeth Moore Hall is a historic women's physical education building associated with West Virginia University and located in Morgantown, Monongalia County, West Virginia. It was built between 1926 and 1928, and is a three-story, red brick building with Georgian Revival detailing. An addition was completed in 1962.  It has a slate covered gable roof.  The front facade features five arches supported by six Doric order columns.  It also has balconies with cast iron balustrades.  The building is named for Elizabeth Moore, principal of Woodburn Female Seminary from 1865 to 1866.

The building currently houses the offices for the dean of students and the Dance Program in the School of Theatre & Dance. With offices in the front part of the building, the back section is over six stories tall and has three levels: a swimming pool, a gymnasium (G1), and a dance studio (210).

It was listed on the National Register of Historic Places in 1985.

References

See also
 National Register of Historic Places listings at colleges and universities in the United States

School buildings completed in 1928
Colonial Revival architecture in West Virginia
Georgian Revival architecture in West Virginia
University and college buildings on the National Register of Historic Places in West Virginia
West Virginia University campus
National Register of Historic Places in Monongalia County, West Virginia
1928 establishments in West Virginia